Starostwo  is a settlement, a part of Lisewo-Parcele colony, in the administrative district of Gmina Skulsk, within Konin County, Greater Poland Voivodeship, in west-central Poland.

References

Starostwo